The 1948–49 Hovedserien was the 5th completed season of top division football in Norway. Following are the results of the 1948–49 Norwegian Main League season. At the top of the Norwegian football league system, it was Norway's top-tier league for association football clubs.

Overview
It was contested by 16 teams, and Fredrikstad FK won the championship.

Teams and locations
Note: Table lists in alphabetical order.

League tables

Group A

Group B

Results

Group A

Group B

Championship final
Vålerengen 1–3 Fredrikstad
Fredrikstad 3–0 Vålerengen

External links
Norway – List of final tables (RSSSF)

Eliteserien seasons
Norway
1
1